Dr. Abbas Khalaf was Saddam Hussein's personal Russian/Arabic interpreter and translator. He was appointed by Saddam Hussein as the Iraqi Ambassador to Russia. After the 2003 invasion of Iraq he remained in Russia with his family. He died in 2013.

Quotes
 "Many people like to say that he oppressed Shi'ites. I'm a Shi'ite, not from his city, not from his clan. When I hear such things I can say from my own experience that it's an exaggeration."
 "He was just in his injustice to everyone. I mean, if there was any opposition, Shi'ite or Sunni, he crushed it. For him, it didn't matter, Shi'ite, Sunni, Kurd, Arab. If they raised their heads, he put them in their place."

According to 
The U.S. Government has identified Abbas Khalaf Kunfuth (Kunfuth) as the former Iraqi Ambassador to Russia and a senior official of the former Iraqi regime, as described in Executive Order 13315 and in United Nations Security Council Resolution 1483. Information available to the U.S. Government indicates that Kunfuth may have used his senior position to embezzle funds of the former regime.

References

External links
 Saddam's ex-translator recalls chilling prediction
 Iraqi Ambassador to Russia, Abbas Khalaf Kunfud Proud of His Nation
 Iraqi Ambassador to stay in Moscow as long as possible
 

2013 deaths
Iraqi diplomats
Iraqi translators
Ambassadors of Iraq to Russia
Russian–Arabic translators
Year of birth missing